S. M. Saiful Hoque is a Bangladeshi diplomat and businessperson. He was Ambassador of Bangladesh to Russia from 2009 to 2019.

He graduated from Taras Shevchenko National University of Kyiv, Ukraine in 1979.

Saiful served as the director, International Programme Development of Human Development Research Centre (HDRC) since 1999.

He is also an Advisor of Bangladesh Center for Culture, Science and Information in St. Petersburg, Russia.

During the celebration of the 49th Independence and National Day of the People's Republic of Bangladesh at the Sri Lankan embassy in Moscow on 28 March 2019, Hoque expressed gratitude toward the Russian Navy sailors who helped to clear the Chittagong harbor of mines and sunken ships after ties between the Soviet Union and Bangladesh were established in 1971.

References

Living people
Ambassadors of Bangladesh to Russia
Taras Shevchenko National University of Kyiv alumni
Bangladeshi businesspeople
Year of birth missing (living people)